Ole Christian Mælen Kvarme (born November 11, 1948 in Molde) is a Norwegian bishop of the Church of Norway. He was bishop of Oslo in the Lutheran Church of Norway from 2005 and 2017. As Bishop of Oslo, Kvarme was the personal prelate of the Norwegian Royal Family.

He graduated from the MF Norwegian School of Theology in 1974, and studied further in Göttingen and Jerusalem. He was ordained to priest for mission service abroad in Bodø in 1975.

Kvarme worked as a research assistant at the MF Norwegian School of Theology 1972 to 1974, as a Bible translator for the Norwegian Bible Society from 1973, as a military chaplain in 1975, as a missionary priest for Den Norske Israelsmisjon in Haifa 1976 to 1981. He was the executive secretary of the Norwegian Bible Society in Israel and of the Norwegian Bible Society on the West Bank from 1976 to 1981. From 1982 to 1986 he led the Caspari Center for Biblical and Jewish Studies, and from 1986 to 1996 he was secretary general of the Norwegian Bible Society.

He was Dean in Oslo Cathedral from 1996 to 1998 and was appointed Bishop of Borg in 1998. In 2005, he was appointed Bishop of Oslo. His appointment as Bishop of Oslo by the second cabinet Bondevik was criticized by non-Christians and liberal Christians because he is loyal to the decision of the highest body of the Church of Norway not to allow non-celibate gay people as priests.

Publications
Kirkens jødiske røtter, Oslo 1985.
Apostlenes Gjerninger - studiebok på hebraisk, Jerusalem 1986.
Bibelen i Norge, Oslo 1991.
Evighet i tiden. En bok om jødisk sabbatsglede og kristen søndagsfeiring, Oslo 1992.
Evangeliet i vår kultur, Oslo 1995 (together with Olav Fykse Tveit).
Åtte dager i Jerusalem. En bok om Jesu påske, om jødisk og kristen påskefeiring, Oslo 1996.
Gjennom det gode landet, Oslo 1997.

External links

Personal webpage (in Norwegian)

1948 births
Living people
Bishops of Oslo
20th-century Lutheran bishops
21st-century Lutheran bishops
MF Norwegian School of Theology, Religion and Society alumni
Norwegian military chaplains
Norwegian Army chaplains